Misamis Occidental (Subanen: Sindepan Mis'samis), officially the Province of Misamis Occidental, is a province located in the region of Northern Mindanao in the Philippines. Its capital is the city of Oroquieta. The province borders Zamboanga del Norte and Zamboanga del Sur to the west and is separated from Lanao del Norte by Panguil Bay to the south and Iligan Bay to the east. The province of Misamis was originally inhabited by Subanens who were an easy target by the sea pirates from Lanao.

The province is named after the early settlement of the Spaniards at the entrance to the Panguil Bay. The name Misamis is believed to have been derived from the Subanen word kuyamis which is a variety of coconut, the staple food of the early settlers. During the years the name persisted as an inference of the geographical location, and upon the advent of the Spanish settlers, the word kuyamis easily gave way to the more convenient pronounceable but corrupted word Misamis.

History
The area of now Misamis Occidental was first occupied by Subanen and later Visayans settled in the coastal areas. The name Misamis is derived from Subanen word kuyamis which is a variety of coconut. During the 1750s was the time that the coastal villages in southern Luzon, Visayas and Mindanao suffered attacks from bands of Muslim pirates, who burned houses and crops, and captured people to be sold as slaves in Maguindanao, Sulu, Borneo or the islands now known as Indonesia. In response, the colonial government in Manila created a flotilla and appointed a Spanish Jesuit missionary, José Ducos, as its commander.

After several successful battles against the pirates, when some peace had been restored, it was decided to build a stone fort at the mouth of Panguil Bay, at a place called Misamis, and Ducos was put in charge of the construction. The construction began in 1756. It was officially called “Fuerte de la Concepción y del Triunfo”.

1818 — Mindanao was organized into five politico-military districts, one of which was the Segundo Distrito de Misamis, the largest district in Mindanao. This area was composed of today's Misamis Oriental, Misamis Occidental, Camiguin, Bukidnon, Lanao, Zamboanga del Norte, and the northern part of Cotabato.
1850 — the town of Misamis became the capital of the district of Misamis until February 27, 1872, when the Spanish Governor General Carlos María de la Torre y Navacerrada issued a decree declaring Cagayan the permanent capital of Segundo Distrito de Misamis. During this era, the name of the town was Cagayan de Misamis. 
 November 2, 1929 — Legislative Act No. 3537 passed, dividing the old province of Misamis into Misamis Occidental and Misamis Oriental, which took effect on January 1, 1930. Misamis Occidental comprised the original nine towns of Baliangao, Lopez Jaena, Tudela, Clarin, Plaridel, Oroquieta, Aloran, Jimenez, and Misamis. Don José Ozámiz y Fortich became the first governor.
 January 6, 1930 — the provincial council of Misamis Occidental selected Oroquieta to become the capital town (cabecera) of the province.
 1935 — the Provincial Capitol Building, commonly called Capitolio, begun and became the seat of executive and legislative power of the province, in the town of Oroquieta.
 May 6, 1942, the Japanese Imperial forces landed in Misamis Occidental, beginning their brief occupation of the province during World War II. In 1945, combined American and Philippine Commonwealth forces liberated the province, and with the help of the recognized guerilla units, defeated the Japanese forces. During World War II, Misamis became the capital of the Free Philippines as the seat of government of the Free Philippines then was the Capitolio. The United States Forces in the Philippines under Colonel Wendell Fertig based in Misamis Occidental, was the rallying point for the guerrillas in Mindanao. This was historically significant because it is the only time in Philippine history when its capital was in Mindanao, in the region then known as Misamis. The Free Philippine Government was then issuing Misamis Occidental emergency notes. Late President Manuel L. Quezon, upon knowing that Oroquieta was made a capital of the Free Philippines and that the town was issuing emergency notes, authorized the printing of the Mindanao emergency note.
 July 16, 1948 — the town of Misamis became a chartered city by virtue of Republic Act 321, making it the 4th city in Mindanao after Zamboanga, Davao and Marawi, also renamed Misamis to Ozamiz after World War II hero Ozámiz who hailed from the province of Misamis Occidental and who at one time also served as its governor and congressional representative of the Lone District of Misamis Occidental, senator of the Philippines, a delegate to the 1935 Constitutional Convention that resulted in the creation of the 1935 Constitution for the Philippine Commonwealth Government.
 Aug. 24, 1981 - Members of a fanatical pseudo-religious paramilitary sect called the "Rock Christ" strafed the house of the Gumapons, a Subanon family, in Barrio Lampasan, Tudela, Misamis Occidental. Ten of the twelve persons in the house, including an infant, were killed.
 May 2010 — the people of Misamis Occidental elected their first female governor, Herminia M. Ramiro.

Geography
Misamis Occidental is located near the narrow strip of land linking Northwestern Mindanao, to the North-central part of the island. Except along the coastal area, hilly and rolling land characterized the provincial terrain. Towards the western border, the terrain is particularly rugged.

Administrative divisions
Misamis Occidental comprises 14 municipalities and 3 component cities, which are organized into two legislative districts and further subdivided into 490 barangays.

Demographics

The dense population along the coast consists mainly of ethnic Cebuanos. Thus, Cebuano is the lingua franca of the province. Most of the native Subanens live in the interior uplands.

Religion
As of 2013, Roman Catholicism remains the predominant faith of the people of Misamis Occidental having 70 percent affiliation and the second most members are with the Iglesia Filipina Independiente or Aglipayan Church with 20% while several Protestant Churches as well as Islam are the minorities.

Economy

The province economy depends firstly on fishing, secondly on coconuts, thirdly on rice. The province has  of coastline fronting the rich fishing grounds of Panguil and Iligan bays. It also has the biggest area of brackish water fishponds in the region. Tangub City is a fishing port on Panguil Bay famous for seafood. Coconut is the chief crop. This is processed into oil, desiccated coconut, and coir, most of which are shipped to Cebu. Coconut processing is the main industry in Oroquieta City. Other crops grown are rice, corn, abaca, coffee, cacao and rubber.

Resources
Wood is the major forest product. Predominant species are the lauan group, apitong, tanguige yakal, and Philippine mahogany. There is also an abundant supply of bamboo, rattan and various vines. Forest land in the province has an area of 66,002.46 hectares; 53,262 hectares of which are considered a national park (which has legal implications).

The province has a considerable deposit of clay especially in the municipalities of Lopez Jaena and Concepcion. Plaridel is the largest in rice production, and the longest coastal town in the province.

There are also an abundant sources of sand and gravel.

The province is traditionally a net exporter of various commodities. Historical data from the Ozamiz Port District of the Bureau of Customs show that outgoing commodities, which is mainly of coconut products, far outweigh incoming cargoes.

Being a coco-based province, major manufacturing firms in Misamis Occidental are engaged in the production of crude coconut oil, cooking oil, lard, margarine, laundry soap and desiccated coconut. Other products are furniture, ceramics gifts toys and housewares, processed food like banana chips and marine products.

Locally fabricated agri-industrial machines and equipment are also available in the province.

Tourism and attractions

 Langaranan Festival Plaridel, Misamis Occidental
 Baobaon Islets Plaridel, Misamis Occidental
 Shang's Resort Plaridel, Misamis Occidental
 Century-Old Nazareno Dam Plaridel, Misamis Occidental
 Caluya Shrine Sapang Dalaga, Misamis Occidental
 Baliangao Protected Landscape and Seascape
 Binalbal Festival, Tudela, Misamis Occidental
 Christmas Symbols Festival, Tangub City
 Dalit Festival, Tangub City
 Dampawan Festival, Concepcion, Misamis Occidental - September
 Fuerte de la Concepcion y del Triunfo, Ozamiz City
 Hoyohoy Highland Stone Chapel & Adventure Park, Tangub City
 Immaculate Conception Cathedral Pipe Organ, Ozamiz City
 Inug-og Festival, Oroquieta City
 Misamis Occidental Aquamarine Park
 Mount Malindang Range Natural Park and Lake Duminagat
 Pas'ungko S'g Mis. Occ. Festival of all Festivals - November
 Sapang Dalaga Falls
 Suman Festival, Clarin, Misamis Occidental - Clarin, the Suman Capital of Misamis Occidental
 Sinakbang Festival, Sinacaban, Misamis Occidental

Government

Misamis Occidental Provincial Officials 2019-2022 Team 18-0 20-0
Congressman:
 1st District: Rep. Diego "Nonoy" C. Ty, C.E. (NUP)
 2nd District: Rep. Henry "Henz" S. Oaminal (NP)

Governor:
 Philip T. Tan (LDP)

Vice Governor:
 Aurora Virginia "Jiejie" M. Almonte (NP)

Board Members:

 1st District:
 Lel M. Blanco, CPA, LLB (NP)
 Ruvy "Alay" D. Ala (NP)
 Winston "DonDon" V. Catane (Asenso Pinoy)
 Rosanne Marie "Tata" L. Paylaga-Lim (Asenso Pinoy)
 Agnes C. Villanueva, CPA (Asenso Pinoy)

 2nd District:
 Tito B. Decina (PDPLBN)
 Elsa F. Navarro (NUP)
 Emeterio B. Roa, Sr. (PDPLBN)
 Atty. Heinjie B. Estaño (NP)
 Nemesio D. Lahaylahay, Sr. (Asenso Pinoy)

Ex-Officio
Sancho "Sunny" S. Oaminal (ABC)
Eduardo "Tata" C. Cebedo (PCL)
Alyssia Ann D. Pao (SK)
Juanidy M. Viña (IPMR)

Misamis Occidental Provincial Officials 2022-2025 Team Straight Asenso

Asenso Misamis Occidental
Governor: Atty. Henry S. Oaminal (NP)
Vice Governor: Rowena “Wheng” L. Gutierrez (PDPLBN)
ABC President: Sancho “Sunny” S. Oaminal Jr. - Ex-Officio Board Member 
SK Federation Chairman: Alyssia Ann D. Pao - Ex-Officio Board Member
IPMR: Juanidy M. Vina - Ex-Officio Board Member
PCL President: Lowida L. Alcalde - Ex-Officio Board Member

Asenso Distrito Uno
Member, House of Representatives: Jason P. Almonte (PDPLBN)
Members, Sangguniang Panlalawigan:
Alejandro “Alex” J. Guantero Jr. (Asenso Pinoy)
Winston “Dondon” V. Catane (Asenso Pinoy)
Rosanne Marie “Tata” L. Paylaga-Lim (Asenso Pinoy)
Donna R. Iyog (Asenso Pinoy)
Agnes C. Villanueva, CPA (Asenso Pinoy)

Asenso Segundo Distrito
Member, House of Representatives: Sancho Fernando “Ando” F. Oaminal (NP)
Members, Sangguniang Panlalawigan:
Calven Tito C. Decina (PDPLBN)
Nemesio D. Lahaylahay Sr. (Asenso Pinoy) 
Eduardo “Tata” C. Cebedo (Asenso Pinoy)
Atty. Heinjie B. Estano (NP)
Jerry R. Cuizon (PDPLBN)

Former governors

Diego Ty Deling
 Anselmo Bernad
 Gella Caay
 Loreto Leo S. Ocampos
 José Ozámiz
 Gedeon G. Quijano
 Henry Y. Regalado Sr.
 Atty. Ernie D. Clarete
 Gorgonio F. Buaquiña II
 William Chiongbian
 Benito Chiongbian 
 Herminia Ramiro

See also
 Laguindingan Airport, the first international airport in Northern Mindanao region.

References

External links

 
 
 Official website
 Philippine Standard Geographic Code
 Local Governance Performance Management System

 
Provinces of the Philippines
Provinces of Northern Mindanao
States and territories established in 1939
1939 establishments in the Philippines